Wintergreen Resort is a four-season mountain resort on the eastern slopes of the Blue Ridge Mountains, located in Nelson County, Virginia and the town of Nellysford. The resort is also in close proximity to the cities of Lynchburg, Waynesboro, and Charlottesville, and within a three-hour drive of Washington, D.C. It opened in 1975 and is currently owned and managed by Pacific Group Resorts, Inc. Unlike other ski resorts, Wintergreen is a "Mountain Top" resort in which all of the amenities are built on the peaks and ridges, rather than at the traditional base.

History

Development 
In 1969, a  tract of land known as The Big Survey, located in the heart of Virginia's Blue Ridge Mountains and home to a wide variety of forestry, timberland, and wildlife, was purchased by a group of investors. Within a few years, Cabot, Cabot & Forbes of Boston purchased The Big Survey, and the planning of the Wintergreen community began. The Sea Pines Company soon joined the group to plan and market the area and a new community.

By 1975, the resort had a large ski area, consisting of eight slopes and three chairlifts, which opened with much fanfare and Virginia Governor Mills E. Godwin in attendance. The resort's first restaurant, The Copper Mine, was open to the public only during the winter months. The original welcoming center, the Wintergreen Country Store, was later added to the National Register of Historic Places in 2005.  In later years, additional ski runs were added in cleared areas to the west and east of the original development and resort village.

Growth 
In 1976 Melba Investors, Inc., a wholly owned subsidiary of Bankers Trust of New York, acquired Wintergreen from Cabot, Cabot & Forbes, and Lewis F. Payne, Jr. founded Wintergreen Development, Inc. to operate the resort and serve as the developer and managing agent.

Within a year, the resort could beckon summer vacationers and residents with the completion of the new Ellis Maples-designed Devils Knob golf course (June 1977) and the opening of the mountain tennis center (June 1978).  In January 1978, Wintergreen hosted its first Winter Special Olympics. There was also an ongoing plant transplantation project, which began to save native plant species, and use them in the resort's landscaping.

Soon after, The Mountain Inn and Conference Center was completed (December 1980), allowing the resort, now owned and managed by Wintergreen Partners, Inc., (being separate and apart of the Wintergreen Property Owners Association). WPI aggressively worked to host conferences and meetings, expanding the resort's initial target market.

Present 
In 2012, Wintergreen Resort was bought for $16.5 million by James C. Justice II, the owner of The Greenbrier Resort in White Sulfur Springs, West Virginia. Following the acquisition, Justice began several construction projects valued at a total of $12 million, including restaurant upgrades, a multimillion-dollar water tank and new snow guns to facilitate the resort's 100% snowmaking coverage, as well as improvements to existing recreational facilities. 

Three years later, in February 2015, the property was sold yet again, this time to EPR Properties of Missouri, a REIT. This time, however, financial details were not disclosed to the public. As part of the sale, the resort was renamed "Wintergreen Pacific LLC." (though continued to do business as Wintergreen Resort) and would be operated by Pacific Group Resorts, Inc., under a long-term lease.

Amenities 
45 holes of golf
seasonal skiing and snowboarding
The Plunge, a 12-lane snowtubing hill with a length of 
22 tennis courts with an award-winning academy
a full-service spa
 of meeting and event space
lodging
three full-service, dine-in restaurants
multiple convenience stores and cafeterias

Resort configuration

Elevation 
 Base: 
 Summit: 
 Vertical rise:

Trails 
Skiable area: 
Trails: 26 total (23% beginner, 35% intermediate, 42% advanced/expert)
Longest run: Tyro - 
Average annual snowfall: 
Terrain Parks: 1

Chairlifts 
5 total
2 high-speed (detachable) six packs
Blue Ridge Express
Highlands Express
1 fixed grip quad
Big Acorn
1 triple chairlift
Logger's Alley
1 double chairlift
Potato Patch

Weather 
Most of the resort and surrounding mountaintop attractions range from 2,500 to 4,000 feet in elevation and therefore average considerably cooler than the nearby Valley or Piedmont cities such as Staunton, Charlottesville, and Lynchburg.  Temperatures on average fall about 4 °F for every thousand feet of elevation making Wintergreen's summit typically 10-15 degrees colder than the valley towns.  This allows for ample winter snowmaking and increased natural snowfall.  However, due to its location well east of the highest ridge of the Appalachians, it receives only about 35 inches a year of natural snow versus some 175 inches in prime spots  to the west.  Despite lack of heavy, consistent snowfall, Wintergreen is much closer and more convenient to the major population centers on the east coast, such as Washington, D.C. and Richmond.

Related links
 Blue Ridge Parkway
 Shenandoah National Park

External links
 Official website
 Wintergreen Property Owners Association
 Nature Foundation at Wintergreen
 Wintergreen Music
 Wintergreen Adaptive Sports

Buildings and structures in Nelson County, Virginia
Ski areas and resorts in Virginia
Tourist attractions in Nelson County, Virginia